Tatiana Shumiakina (born 4 October 1965) is a Russian chess player who holds the title of Woman Grandmaster (WGM, 1994).

Chess career
In 1990 Shumiakina won a bronze medal in USSR Women's Chess Championship. In 2000 she won Russia Women's Chess Cup. Won multiple international women's chess tournaments: Prešov (1988), Chelyabinsk (1990), Timișoara (1994) Bucharest (1994, together with Elena-Luminiţa Cosma). 

Shumiakina twice participated in the Women's World Chess Championship Interzonal Tournaments where in 1993 in Jakarta and in 1995 in Chişinău she ranked 22nd place. In 2001 Tatiana Shumiakina participated in Women's World Chess Championship 2001 by knock-out and in the first round lost to Elina Danielian.

Shumiakina played for Russia in the Women's Chess Olympiads:
 In 1992, at third board in the 30th Chess Olympiad (women) in Manila (+5, =3, -4),
 In 1994, at third board in the 31st Chess Olympiad (women) in Moscow (+4, =3, -3),
 In 1998, at third board in the 33rd Chess Olympiad (women) in Elista (+6, =1, -1) and won team silver and individual gold medals.

In 1989, she was awarded the FIDE Woman International Master (WIM) title and received the FIDE Woman Grandmaster (WGM) title five year later.

Shumiakina graduated from the Chelyabinsk State Institute of Physical Culture. She works as a chess trainer in Chelyabinsk children and youth sports school.

References

External links
 
 
 

1965 births
Living people
Sportspeople from Chelyabinsk
Russian female chess players
Soviet female chess players
Chess woman grandmasters
Chess Olympiad competitors